Shadow, in comics, may refer to:

The Shadow, a fictional character that originated in a series of pulp magazines who also appeared in a number of comic strips and comic books
Shadow-X, an alternative version of the X-Men
Shadow the Hedgehog, Sonic character who has appeared in the Sonic comics
Shadows (comics), an Image Comics limited series

It may also refer to:

Crypt of Shadows, a Marvel Comics horror anthology comic
Dark Shadows, a comic book series based on the TV series, published by Gold Key Comics
Shadow Cabinet (comics), a Milestone Comics superhero tean
Shadowcat, an alias used by Kitty Pryde
Shadowclaw, a Marvel Comics character from New Exiles
Shadow Dancer, a Marvel 2099 character
Shadowdragon, a DC Comics character
Shadows Fall (comics), a 1994 Vertigo limited series
Shadowhawk, an Image Comics character
Shadow Hunter (comics), a Virgin Comics series
Shadow Initiative, a black-ops group of Marvel Comics characters in The Initiative
Shadow King, a Marvel Comics supervillain
Shadowknight, a Marvel Comics character from Moon Knight
Shadow Lady, a manga written and drawn by Masakazu Katsura
Shadow Lass, a DC Comics superhero and member of the Legion of Super-Heroes.
Shadowman (comics), a Valiant Comics character
Shadowpact, a DC Comics group
Shadowqueen, a Marvel Comics character who has appeared in Doctor Strange
Shadow Riders (comics), a Marvel UK mini-series
Shadow Stalker, a Marvel Comics character from Heroes for Hire
Shadowstorm, a DC Comics character who is the dark side of Firestorm
Shadowstryke, a DC Comics character
Shadow Thief, two DC Comics supervillains
Shadow War (comics), a Milestone Comic crossover
Shadowoman, an alias for the Marvel Comics character usually known as Sepulchre
Storm Shadow (G.I. Joe), a G.I. Joe character who has appeared in the comic book spin-offs, including his own series

See also
Shadow (disambiguation)

References